Crimson Desert is an upcoming action role-playing game developed and published by Pearl Abyss.

Overview 
Crimson Desert is set in a medieval fantasy world, on a continent called Pywel. Macduff, the main character, is a mercenary who finds himself beleaguered by the burdens of leadership and painful memories of his past.

Development
The game was originally planned as a prequel to Black Desert Online but the development of the game eventually transformed into something else and the game changed to a single player game set in the same universe. In December 2020, after the release of the trailer at the Game Awards, Pearl Abyss released commentary videos to explain the development of the game and their vision for it. The game uses an upgraded version of Black Desert Online proprietary game engine called BlackSpace Engine.

References

External links 
 
 Official YouTube channel

Upcoming video games
PlayStation 5 games
Xbox Series X and Series S games
Single-player video games
Video games developed in South Korea
Action-adventure games
Open-world video games
Windows games
Pearl Abyss games